François Merry Delabost (29 August 1836 – 11 March 1918) was a French physician.

Chief-physician in a French prison in Rouen, he is known to be the inventor of the shower in 1872.

External links 
 Karl Feltgen, Dr Merry Delabost inventor of the shower ? (french)
 Merry Delabost Rouen History website

1836 births
1918 deaths
19th-century French physicians
Chevaliers of the Légion d'honneur